Chicago International Charter School (CICS) - Northtown Academy is a 4–year charter high school in the North Park neighborhood on the northwest side of  Chicago, Illinois, United States. The school is administered by Civitas Schools. The school is located at the intersection of Pulaski Road and Peterson Avenue and the school's address is 3900 West Peterson Avenue.

Located on Chicago's Northwest side, CICS Northtown Academy is a college preparatory high school.

Founded in 2002, its primary goal is to educate 9th to 12th grade students for college. Its athletics include baseball, basketball, cheerleading, cross country, soccer, softball, track sports, and volleyball. It has a variety of other extra-curricular activities including a student council, a National Honors Society, an Asian Student Alliance club, a reptile club, and a Latin Dance club.

On April 3, 2009, teachers at Northtown, in conjunction with their colleagues at the two other Civitas Schools campuses, filed Authorization for Representation cards with the Illinois Educational Labor Relations Board to be the first charter teachers in Chicago to be represented by a union, the Chicago Alliance of Charter Teachers & Staff.

Bus routes 
CTA
53 Pulaski
84 Peterson

References

External links 
 CICS Northtown Academy
 Civitas Schools

Public high schools in Chicago
Educational institutions established in 2002
2002 establishments in Illinois
Charter schools in Chicago
North Park, Chicago